Air Marshal Amit Tiwari, PVSM, AVSM, VM is a retired officer of the Indian Air Force. He served as the Air Officer Commanding-in-Chief (AOC-in-C), Central Air Command. He assumed the office on 1 February 2021 succeeding Air Marshal Rajesh Kumar and served till 31 May 2021. He is succeeded by Air Marshal Richard John Duckworth. Previously, he served as AOC-in-C of Southern Air Command.

Early life and education 
Amit is an alumnus of National Defence Academy. He is also a graduate of Defence Services Staff College, College of Defence Management and National Defence College.

Career
Amit was commissioned in the Indian Air Force as a fighter pilot in June 1982. He is a qualified flight instructor, and has a flying experience of over 3500 hours on various fighter aircraft.

In his career, he has held several positions including team leader of Surya Kiran aerobatic squadron, station commander of a forward base, air attache at Indian embassy in Afghanistan, as well as air defence commander and senior officer-in-charge of administration at an operational command. His other appointments include assistant chief of air staff (training) at air headquarters and commandant air force academy.

Prior to his appointment as AOC-in-C, Southern Air command, Amit served as Air Officer in charge of Personnel at air headquarters, VayuSena Bhawan in New Delhi.

Honours and decorations 
During his career, Amit has been awarded the VayuSena Medal (VM) and the Ati Vishisht Seva Medal (AVSM) and the Param Vishisht Seva Medal in 2021 for his service.

Personal life 
Amit is married to Poonam Tiwari, who took over as President, Air Force Wives Welfare Association (Regional).

References 

Living people
Indian Air Force air marshals
National Defence Academy (India) alumni
Recipients of the Ati Vishisht Seva Medal
Recipients of the Vayu Sena Medal
Year of birth missing (living people)
National Defence College, India alumni
Commandants of the Indian Air Force Academy
Recipients of the Param Vishisht Seva Medal
Indian air attachés
College of Defence Management alumni
Defence Services Staff College alumni